The Isuzu V engine is a family of all-aluminum  75° V6 gasoline engines produced by Isuzu. They feature either a belt-driven SOHC or DOHC valvetrain. Later versions feature direct ignition as well as gasoline direct injection. These engines are notable for their early adoption of gasoline direct injection technology and also for their uncommon 75° cylinder head bank angle.These V6s were used in the first Gen Rodeo,Amigo,Trooper, 2nd Gen Rodeo,Rodeo sport,Trooper

6VD1
The first generation of 6VD1 3.2L SOHC and 6VD1-W DOHC V6 engines were used from 1992-1995. The original SOHC 6VD1 featured 175 hp (at 4,888 rpms) with 188 ft*lb of torque. The first generation DOHC 6VD1-W was featured only in RS and some LS trim Trooper/Bighorns between 1992 and 1995, outputting 195 horsepower at 5600 RPM and 195 ft*lb of torque at 3600 RPM. This DOHC variant had low impedance injectors as well as a higher compression ratio than the SOHC, necessitating the use of a knock sensor.

The second generation SOHC 6VD1 made 190 hp from 1996-1997.

Applications:
 Isuzu Trooper
 Isuzu MU
 Isuzu Faster
 Isuzu Rodeo / Isuzu Rodeo Sport / Isuzu Amigo / Honda Passport
 Isuzu VehiCROSS

6VE1
The 6VE1-W 3.5L DOHC 24V V6 was introduced in 1998 with 215 hp (160 kW) and used until 2004 with the termination of the Isuzu Axiom. Drive by wire was introduced in 2002 and increased output to 230 hp (173 kW). Gasoline direct injection was added for 2004 only and boosted output to 250 hp (186 kW).

Applications:
 Isuzu Trooper
 Isuzu VehiCROSS
 Isuzu MU
 Isuzu Axiom
 Isuzu Rodeo

References

Gasoline engines
Isuzu
V6 engines